Dinia mena is a moth of the family Erebidae. It was described by Jacob Hübner in 1827.

Description
The wings are hyaline (glass like), except to the black veins and borders. The forewings show a black band across the base, and the hindwings have a broad black band on the hind border. The head and thorax are black, while the abdomen is mainly red with a black tip.

Distribution
This species can be found in Colombia, Venezuela, Trinidad and Brazil.

References

Euchromiina
Moths described in 1827
Arctiinae of South America